Gary Edwin Deffenbaugh (born April 25, 1949) is an American politician serving in the Arkansas House of Representatives.

Education and career
Deffenbaugh has a Bachelor of Science in education from Ouachita Baptist University. He is a retired teacher and coach.

Arkansas House of Representatives
Deffenbaugh won the primary election for Arkansas House of Representatives District 66 on May 16, 2010, winning 1,426 votes to 719 against Kevin R. Holmes.
Deffenbaugh won the general election for District 66 on November 2, 2010, winning 5,113 votes to 1,851 against Diana K. Faucher.

88th Arkansas General Assembly (2011-2012)
Deffenbaugh began serving as a Representative in January 2011. During the 88th Assembly, Deffenbaugh served on the following committees:

 Aging, Children and Youth, Legislative and Military Affairs
 Judiciary
 Public Retirement and Social Security Programs

Beginning with the 2012 election, Deffenbaugh was redistricted from District 66 to District 79 in the Arkansas House of Representatives. The new districts would go into effect starting with the 89th Assembly.

Deffenbaugh was unopposed in the 2012 election for District 79 of the Arkansas House of Representatives.

89th Arkansas General Assembly (2013-2014)
Deffenbaugh was officially redistricted from District 66 to District 79 on January 14, 2013, the first day of the 89th Assembly. During the 89th Assembly, Deffenbaugh served on the following committees:

 Public Retirement and Social Security Programs
 Education
 Aging, Children and Youth, Legislative and Military Affairs
 Legislative Joint Auditing

Deffenbaugh was unopposed in the 2014 election for District 79 of the Arkansas House of Representatives.

90th Arkansas General Assembly (2015-2016)
During the 90th Assembly, Deffenbaugh served on the following committees:

 City, County and Local Affairs
 Education
 Legislative Council
 Public Retirement and Social Security Programs, Vice chair

Deffenbaugh was unopposed in the 2016 election for District 79 of the Arkansas House of Representatives.

91st Arkansas General Assembly (2017-2018)
During the 91st Assembly, Deffenbaugh served on the following committees:

 City, County and Local Affairs
 Education
 Public Retirement and Social Security Programs, Vice chair

Deffenbaugh was unopposed in the 2018 election for District 79 of the Arkansas House of Representatives.

92nd Arkansas General Assembly (2019-2020)
During the 92nd Assembly, Deffenbaugh served on the following committees:

 Legislative Council
 Public Retirement and Social Security Programs Committee, Vice-Chair
 House City, County and Local Affairs Committee
 House Education Committee

Deffenbaugh was unopposed in the 2020 election for District 79 of the Arkansas House of Representatives.

93rd Arkansas General Assembly (2021-2022)
During the 93rd Assembly, Deffenbaugh served on the following committees:

 House Education Committee
 House State Agencies and Governmental Affairs Committee
 Legislative Council
 Public Retirement and Social Security Programs Committee, Vice-chair

On January 13, 2022, Deffenbaugh announced he would not be seeking re-election.

Personal life
Deffenbaugh resides in Van Buren, Arkansas. He is a Southern Baptist. He is married and has two adult children.

References

1949 births
Living people
Republican Party members of the Arkansas House of Representatives
21st-century American politicians
People from Crawford County, Arkansas